These Are Field Recordings is an album released independently by Matthew Ryan in 2004. This album is not available for sale or download.

Track listing
All words and music by Matthew Ryan. 
 Bass, Electric Guitar – Brian Bequette
 Drums – Steve Latanation
 Performer – Billy Mercer, Clay Steakley, Craig Krampf, Danny Torrell, Doug Lancio, Kevin Teel, Molly Thomas (2), Richard McLaurin

Disc one
"One Day the Everclear" – 4:00
"Fathers and Compromise" – 5:06
"The World Is on Fire" – 4:33
"Railroaded" – 4:18
"Return to Me" – 6:03
"Sweetie" – 3:41
"I Must Love Leaving" – 4:34
"Irrelevant" – 5:00
"Autopilot" – 3:42
"Trouble Doll" – 4:57

Disc two
"The Little Things" – 3:30
"Still Part Two" – 4:59
"Sadlylove" – 3:49
"Heartache Weather" – 3:51
"I Can't Steal You" – 5:58
"Chrome" – 4:55
"I Hope Your God Has Mercy on Mine" – 3:18
"I Hear a Symphony" – 4:11
"Dragging the Lake" – 5:18
"This Side of Heaven" – 3:13
"Bone of Truth" – 3:45

References

2004 albums
Matthew Ryan (musician) albums